The following lists events that happened during 1997 in Zaire.

Incumbents 
 President: Mobutu Sese Seko
 Prime Minister: Léon Kengo wa Dondo – Étienne Tshisekedi – Likulia Bolongo

Events

See also

 Zaire
 History of the Democratic Republic of the Congo
 First Congo War
 1997 in the Democratic Republic of the Congo

References

Sources

 

 
Years of the 20th century in Zaire
Zaire
1990s in Zaire
Zaire